The Onoserideae are a tribe  of flowering plants in the family Asteraceae.

Genera

Aphyllocladus Wedd.
Gypothamnium Phil. (one sp.)
Lycoseris Cass.
Onoseris Willd.
Plazia Ruiz & Pav
Urmenetea Phil.

References

External links

 
Asteraceae tribes